The 2023 season will be the Los Angeles Chargers' upcoming 54th season in the National Football League, their 64th overall, their eighth in the Greater Los Angeles Area, their fourth playing their home games at SoFi Stadium and their third under head coach Brandon Staley. They will attempt to improve on their 10–7 record from last year, make the playoffs for the second consecutive season, and end their 13-year AFC West title drought. This will be the first season since 2018 to not include Nasir Adderley, as he announced his retirement on March 16.

Roster changes

Free agency

Unrestricted

Restricted and exclusive-rights

Futures 
Shortly after the end of their 2022 season, the Chargers signed twelve players on their practice squad to reserve/future free agent contracts.

Signings

Retirements
Free safety Nasir Adderley announced his retirement on March 16. Adderley was drafted by the Chargers in 2019 and appeared in 50 games in four seasons.

Releases/waivers

Draft

Notes

Staff

Coaching changes

Current roster

Preseason
The Chargers' preseason opponents and schedule will be announced in the spring.

Regular season

2023 opponents
Listed below are the Chargers' opponents for 2023. Exact dates and times will be announced in the spring.

References

External links
 

Los Angeles Chargers
Los Angeles Chargers seasons
Los Angeles Chargers
Chargers